Akin Island is a wide, rocky island 280 m long in southeast-northwest direction and 100 m lying off the north coast of Nelson Island in the South Shetland Islands, Antarctica. It is “named after Akin Point on the Bulgarian Black Sea Coast.”

Location
British mapping in 1968.

Maps
 South Shetland Islands. Scale 1:200000 topographic map No. 3373. DOS 610 - W 62 58. Tolworth, UK, 1968.
 Antarctic Digital Database (ADD). Scale 1:250000 topographic map of Antarctica. Scientific Committee on Antarctic Research (SCAR). Since 1993, regularly upgraded and updated.

Notes

References
 Akin Island. SCAR Composite Gazetteer of Antarctica.
 Bulgarian Antarctic Gazetteer. Antarctic Place-names Commission. (details in Bulgarian, basic data in English)

External links
 Akin Island. Copernix satellite image

Islands of the South Shetland Islands
Bulgaria and the Antarctic